Royseux Castle is a castle in the ancienne commune of Vierset-Barse, in the municipality of Modave, Liège Province, Wallonia, Belgium.

See also
List of castles in Belgium

External links
Château de Royseux, www.chateauxofbelgium.be 

Castles in Belgium
Castles in Liège Province